The Constitution: That Delicate Balance is a television series broadcast originally broadcast in the USA in 1984 on The Learning Channel. Produced by Columbia University as part of its Media & Society Seminars program, the series was filmed in Congress Hall in Philadelphia, Pennsylvania, in 1982-83 as a series of seminars with a group of around 15-20 politicians, journalists, educators and others, including the former President Gerald Ford and the former U.S. Supreme Court Justice Potter Stewart, who also participated in related discussion with the series host Fred Friendly (these discussions took place in Independence Hall).

Others participants included (titles are as at time of broadcast):
  Judge Arlin Adams
 Laurence Barrett
 Judge Robert Bork
 David Broder
 Philip Buchen
 Prof. Archibald Cox
 Lloyd Cutler
 Senator Christopher Dodd (Connecticut)
 US Rep Barney Frank (Massachusetts)
 Senator Orrin Hatch (Utah)
 Justice Irving Kaufman, US Court of Appeals
 Jim Lehrer
 Ann Lewis
 Anthony Lewis
 US Rep Barbara Mikulski (Maryland)
 Bill Moyers
 Former Senator Edmund Muskie
 US Rep Charles B. Rangel (New York)
 Lt General Brent Scowcroft
 Gerry Spence
 James D. St. Clair
 Jack Valenti
 Judge Patricia Wald
 Judge J. Clifford Wallace
 Ben Wattenberg
 Tom Wicker

The filmed material was then edited into hour-long episodes relating to a particular topic. Each episode started with Friendly introducing an issue such as Executive Privilege or The War Powers Act, and went to a seminar discussing the topic. The episode usually finished with Friendly discussing the issue with former Justice Potter Stewart.

Episodes
(episodes titles are not given in credits; titles listed here are as spoken in introduction)
 01 "Can the President Make a Decision of National Importance Without Consulting the Congress?" (Executive Privilege and Delegation of Powers); moderated by Benno C. Schmidt, Jr., Dean of Columbia Law School
 02 "Can the President Commit American Troops Without Permission From Congress?" (War Powers and Covert Action); moderated by Benno C. Schmidt, Jr.
 03 "Is the Way We Elect a President a Disaster Waiting to Happen?"  (Presidential Nomination, Election & Succession); moderated by Prof. Arthur R. Miller
 04 "The Rights of Criminal Defendants versus Safety on Our Streets" (Criminal Justice and a Defendant's Right to a Fair Trial); moderated by Prof. Charles Nesson
 05 "Does the Insanity Defense Serve to Shield the Guilty Or Does It Work to Protect the Mentally Ill?" (Crime and Insanity); moderated by Prof. Charles Nesson
 06 "Who Goes to Prison, For How Long and Under What Conditions?" (Crime and Punishments); moderated by Prof. Charles Nesson
 07 "Does the Cost of Campaigning Corrupt the System?" (Campaign Spending); moderated by Tyrone Brown, a Washington attorney
 08 "National Security versus Freedom of the Press"; moderated by Benno Schmidt
 09 "School Prayer, Gun Control & the Right of Extremist Groups to Assemble: Who Decides?"; moderated by Prof. Arthur R. Miller
 10 "The Sovereign Self: The Right To Live, The Right to Die"; moderated by Prof. Arthur R. Miller
 11 "Can This Nation of Immigrants Deny Opportunity to the Latest New-Comers: How Many Aliens Can We Absorb?" (Immigration Reform); moderated by Benno C. Schmidt, Jr.
 12 "Affirmative Action vs Reverse Discrimination"; moderated by Tyrone Brown
 13 "Can the States, Which Created the Federal Government, Be Forced to Accept Federal Standards for Education?" (Federalism); moderated by Prof. Lewis Kaden

"The 1787 Constitutional Convention"
Although not formally part of the series, a related 2-hour program (also hosted by Friendly), was made in 1987 for the 200th-anniversary of the 1787 Constitutional Convention.

External links 
 Resource: The Constitution: That Delicate Balance at Annenberg Learner

1984 American television series debuts
American television talk shows
Columbia University
TLC (TV network) original programming